Kofoworola Oladoyinbo Ojomo is the paramount Yoruba king of Ijebu, Owo in Ondo State, southwestern Nigeria. He is a descendant of Ojugbelu Arere, the pioneer Olowo of Owo.

He ascended the throne on June 13, 2004, following the demise of Agboola Ojomo Agunloye in May 2003. He ascended the throne after retiring from the Nigerian Army with the rank of General.

Early life and education
Kofoworola Oladoyinbo Ojomo was born in Ijebu, Owo, Ondo State during the 1940s. He studied mechanical engineering at Ahmadu Bello University, and graduated in 1968. He then joined the Nigerian Army as a military officer.

Installation controversy
There was a controversy over his installation on June 13, 2004. Following his nomination by the king-makers as a qualified and preferred candidate for the throne, Amaka who was also a candidate sought a High Court order to annul his candidacy. This was refused, and Kofoworola was affirmed as the Ojomo Oluda. Amaka was not satisfied with this judgment and appealed against it. installed by oba DVF olateru-olagbegi

References

Yoruba monarchs
Nigerian traditional rulers
People from Owo
Living people
Year of birth missing (living people)